is a Japanese footballer currently playing as a right-back for YSCC Yokohama.

Career statistics

Club
.

Notes

References

External links

1998 births
Living people
Japanese footballers
Japanese expatriate footballers
Association football defenders
J3 League players
Taiwan Football Premier League players
YSCC Yokohama players
Taichung Futuro F.C. players
Japanese expatriate sportspeople in Taiwan
Expatriate footballers in Taiwan